Zhongdong may refer to the following locations in China:

 Zhongdong, Jinta County (中东镇), town in Jinta County, Gansu
 Zhongdong, Ziyun County (中洞), village in Guizhou renowned as the last cave settlement in China